The 1880 Massachusetts gubernatorial election was held on November 2.

Governor

Lt. Governor

See also
 1880 Massachusetts legislature

References

Governor
1880
Massachusetts
November 1880 events